Joseph Holder may refer to:

Joseph Bassett Holder (1824–1888), American zoologist and physician
Joseph William Holder (1764–1832), English composer